The 2015 UCI America Tour was the eleventh season for the UCI America Tour. The season began on 9 January 2015 with the Vuelta al Táchira and ended on 25 December 2015 with the Vuelta a Costa Rica.

The points leader, based on the cumulative results of previous races, wears the UCI America Tour cycling jersey. Throughout the season, points are awarded to the top finishers of stages within stage races and the final general classification standings of each of the stages races and one-day events. The quality and complexity of a race also determines how many points are awarded to the top finishers, the higher the UCI rating of a race, the more points are awarded.

The UCI ratings from highest to lowest are as follows:
 Multi-day events: 2.HC, 2.1 and 2.2
 One-day events: 1.HC, 1.1 and 1.2

Events

Standings
Standings as of November 25th.

References

External links
 

UCI America Tour
2015 in road cycling
UCI
UCI